Mopah International Airport (Indonesian: Bandar Udara Internasional Mopah)  is an international airport in Merauke, South Papua, Indonesia. The airport is Indonesia's second easternmost airport after Sentani International Airport in Sentani. The airport serves as the main gateway to several tourist destinations around Merauke, the most notably is Wasur National Park.

History

The original air strip measured 150 X 6,000' and was started on June 28, 1943 by Seabees of the 55th Naval Construction Battalion during World War II as part of Naval Base Merauke. The airfield had a No. 86 Squadron RAAF and a few bombers assigned to do daily reconnaissance and bombing missions. After the Surrender of Japan in 1945, allied forces departed the airfield and military control of the airport was handed over to the government of Dutch East Indies in 1945. The airport is then managed by the Dutch organization Netherlands Indies Civil Administration (NICA). Following 
the New York Agreement.   The Dutch handed the control of the airport to the Indonesian government in 1962 when they left New Guinea.

With the continued increase in tourist visits, the activity of airlines using the airport is also increased. The old terminal building which only has an area of 1,972 m2 and can only accommodate up to 331 passengers at peak hours are no longer sufficient because it exceeds the capacity of the terminal. To increase the capacity of the terminal, the  terminal building was extensively renovated in 2015. The airport terminal was expanded from just 1.972 m2 to 4.634 m2. It can now cater around 200,000 passenger annually. The check-in counter and baggage claim area now has a more minimalist interior. The airport's parking lot was also expanded to cater more vehicles. The airport's toilet was also renovated extensively. The boarding lounge was also expanded and now contains 381 seats for the passengers to seat on. Outside the terminal building, canopy has now been installed at the drop off location so that passengers avoid the heat and rain when they arrive at the terminal building. In one corner of the terminal, ATM Center also food court are now built. To add to the beauty and comfort for the passengers, around the terminal has been planted with trees and green grass. In total, the rehabilitation and expansion of the terminal building cost around Rp 16 billion.

A new terminal building is planned to be constructed. It is predicted to start by the end of 2016. The new airport terminal is slated to be the largest airport terminal in the province of Papua and West Papua. The new terminal would have an area of 21,000 m2.

Airlines and destinations

Passenger

Accidents and incidents 

 On 26 January 2023, the right wing of Lion Air JT 797 hit a jet bridge when the aircraft is moving to the runway for takeoff. The aircraft is damaged. The police stated that the pilot likely can't see the jet bridge because of the size of the aircraft.

References

External links

Mopah Airport - Indonesia Airport Global Website

Merauke
Airports in South Papua
Transport in Western New Guinea